Lorenzo Jerome (born January 20, 1995) is an American football free safety. He played college football at St. Francis.

Early years
Jerome was a three-year starter at quarterback and defensive back at J.P. Taravella High School.

College career
Jerome started all 11 games his freshman year and was named NEC Defensive Rookie of the Year. As a junior, Jerome was named second-team All-American as a kick returner by STATS FCS. At the conclusion of his senior year, Jerome accepted invitations to play in the January 2017 editions of the NFLPA Collegiate Bowl and Senior Bowl, the first player in SFU and NEC history to be invited to those games. He had two interceptions in each all-star game, and a forced fumble in the Senior Bowl. He was named the MVP of the NFLPA Collegiate Bowl. Jerome also became first player in school and conference history to be invited to the NFL Scouting Combine.

Professional career

San Francisco 49ers
Jerome was signed by the San Francisco 49ers as an undrafted free agent on May 4, 2017. After making the initial 53-man roster, Jerome was waived by the 49ers on October 9, 2017.

Seattle Seahawks
On July 30, 2018, Jerome signed with the Seattle Seahawks. He was waived on September 1, 2018.

Calgary Stampeders
Jerome signed with the Calgary Stampeders on January 8, 2019. After the CFL canceled the 2020 season due to the COVID-19 pandemic, Jerome chose to opt-out of his contract with the Stampeders on August 26, 2020.

Saskatchewan Roughriders
Jerome signed with the Saskatchewan Roughriders on February 9, 2021.

References

External links
 San Francisco 49ers bio

1995 births
Living people
American football safeties
Players of Canadian football from Florida
Calgary Stampeders players
Canadian football defensive backs
People from Sunrise, Florida
Players of American football from Florida
Saint Francis Red Flash football players
San Francisco 49ers players
Saskatchewan Roughriders players
Seattle Seahawks players
Sportspeople from Broward County, Florida